Strigel is a German surname. Notable people with the surname include:

Bernhard Strigel ( 1461–1528), German painter
Daniel Strigel (born 1975), German fencer
Victorinus Strigel (1524–1569), German Lutheran theologian

German-language surnames